Oladele Muniru Ajiboye (born 7 August 1990 in Osogbo, Osun State) is a Nigerian football goalkeeper. He currently plays for Plateau United F.C.

Career 
Ajiboye began his career with Prime F.C., and in September 2008 joined Wikki Tourists F.C. after one year with Wikki Tourists, where he played 14 games, he left on 16 September 2009 to sign with the Spanish club Pontevedra CF.
After being released from Pontevedra in November 2011, he signed the next month with Shooting Stars.
After 3SC's relegation in 2013, he signed to play for Nasarawa United. However, transfer issues kept him from playing until two months in the new season.

International career 
Ajiboye represented Nigeria at the 2007 FIFA U-17 World Cup in South Korea, winning the championship with the Golden Eaglets. On 15 December 2008, he was called up to the Nigerian under-20 team for the 2009 African Youth Championship in Rwanda and also played at the 2009 FIFA U-20 World Cup in Egypt.

He was Nigeria's starting goalkeeper for the 2012 Summer Olympics qualifiers and 2011 All Africa Games qualifiers under coach Augustine Eguavoen.

In May 2018, he was named in Nigeria's preliminary-30 man squad for the 2018 FIFA World Cup in Russia. However, he did not make the final 23.

It has been suggested in the media that he is older than his officially-registered age.

References

External Links

1990 births
Living people
Sportspeople from Osogbo
Nigerian footballers
Nigeria under-20 international footballers
Nigerian expatriate footballers
Association football goalkeepers
Yoruba sportspeople
Pontevedra CF footballers
Segunda División B players
Osun United F.C. players
Expatriate footballers in Spain
Wikki Tourists F.C. players
2011 CAF U-23 Championship players
Nigeria A' international footballers
2018 African Nations Championship players
Nigerian expatriate sportspeople in Spain
21st-century Nigerian people